Pegasus was a gaming magazine published from 1981 to 1983 by Judges Guild.

Contents
Pegasus was a magazine containing a 32-page supplement in each issue, plus articles on AD&D variants, new magic and monsters, tips on gamemastering, fiction and reviews.

History
After failing with new licenses and computer games, Judges Guild rebooted its magazines with Pegasus #1 (April/May 1981), again by Mike Reagan. The first issue was 96 pages, larger than Judges Guild's old magazines, and returned to the pulp-quality pages and covers of the previous magazines. The first issue included a 36-page city-state campaign installment, "The Black Ring" by Dan Hauffe. Guild membership just got members a subscription to Pegasus, and with issue #3 (1981), that also included a 10% discount on some products, highlighted in each issue of the magazine. Over its lifetime, Pegasus would feature articles for D&D, Arduin Grimoire, Champions, The Fantasy Trip, The Morrow Project, RuneQuest, Skull & Crossbones, Stormbringer, Traveller, Tunnels & Trolls, Villains and Vigilantes, and Ysgarth. The staff of Pegasus changed frequently; Chuck Anshell returned to edit it with #3 (1981) and was replaced by Edward Mortimer in #5 (December 1981); with issue #9 (August/September 1982), Mark Holmer took over, and he was then replaced by Mike Maddin for the final issue, #12 (February/March 1983). Pegasus #13 was sent to the printers, but is said to have disappeared and was not published before Judges Guild stopped publication altogether.

Reception
W. G. Armintrout reviewed the first issue of Pegasus in The Space Gamer No. 44. Armintrout commented that "I can't recommend Pegasus as a magazine. However, the installment supplement was nearly excellent. If you play AD&D and you think supplements a year for [the price] is a good deal, then subscribe."

References

External links
 Pegasus issue contents and index at RPG Geek

Defunct magazines published in the United States
Hobby magazines published in the United States
Judges Guild publications
Magazines established in 1981
Magazines disestablished in 1983
Role-playing game magazines